John Beattie West (1790 – 27 December 1841) was an Irish Conservative politician and barrister.

He held the seat until the next year, when he was defeated at that year's general election. He regained the seat in 1841, but died later that year.

He married in 1819 Elizabeth Felicia  Burton, only daughter of Mr Justice Charles Burton and  Anna Andrews, with whom he had seven children:
 Anna Felicia (b. 1822), who married Sir Croker Barrington, 4th Baronet in 1845.
 Charlotte Beatty (b. 1824),  who married Sir Henry  Vansittart Stonhouse, 15th Baronet in 1851.
 Maria Alphonsine, who married  her cousin (on her mother's side), the Australian judge and statesman Sir William Westbrooke Burton in 1846 or 1847,
 Charles  Burton (b. 1826).
 Francis Jane (b. 1828).
 Elizabeth Burton.
 Francis Edmund (b. 1836), who married Jane Caroline Adams of St. Stephen's Green in 1867 and was a Colonel in the Madras Staff Corps.

References

External links
 

1790 births
1841 deaths
UK MPs 1835–1837
UK MPs 1841–1847
Irish Conservative Party MPs